The Drayton and Toowoomba colonial by-election, 1862 was a by-election held on 11 August 1862 in the electoral district of Drayton and Toowoomba for the Queensland Legislative Assembly.

History
On 26 July 1862, John Watts, the member for Drayton and Toowoomba, resigned. William Henry Groom won the resulting by-election on 11 August 1862.

See also
 Members of the Queensland Legislative Assembly, 1860–1863

References

1862 elections in Australia
Queensland state by-elections
1860s in Queensland